

Events

May events 
 May 17 – The Arkansas Short Line Railroad, a predecessor of St. Louis Southwestern Railway, is incorporated.

July events 
 July 1 – The Great Railroad Strike of 1922 begins in the United States, coinciding with a reduction in railroad shop wages by seven cents per day mandated by the Railroad Labor Board. Continues until September 1.

August events 
 August 31 – H. L. Hamilton and Paul Turner form a company called Electro-Motive Engineering (later to become General Motors Electro-Motive Division) in Cleveland, Ohio.

October events 
 October – International Union of Railways (UIC) established in Paris to promote co-operation and standardisation.
 October 22 – Stuttgart Hauptbahnhof (first stage) opened in Germany.

November events 
 The first Willamette locomotive is built for Coos Bay Lumber Company of Marshfield, Oregon.
 July 26 – The Drammen Line in Norway takes electric traction into use between Oslo West Station and Brakerøya.

December events 
 December 9 – Chemins de fer de Paris à Lyon et à la Méditerranée resumes the Calais-Mediterranée Express, now known as Le Train Bleu because of its Wagons-Lits cars, between Calais Gare Maritime and Menton on the French Riviera.

Unknown date events 
 The New York Central acquires the Cleveland, Cincinnati, Chicago and St. Louis Railroad (the Big Four Railroad).
 Sir Henry Thornton succeeds David Blyth Hanna as president of Canadian National Railway.
 George Hughes succeeds H. P. M. Beames as Chief Mechanical Engineer of the London and North Western Railway.

Births

February births 
 February 27 – Robert B. Claytor, president of Norfolk and Western Railway (died 1993)

March births 
 March 22 – Livio Dante Porta, Argentinian steam locomotive mechanical engineer (died 2003)

July births 
 July 20 – Alan Stephenson Boyd, first United States Secretary of Transportation 1966–1969, president of Illinois Central Railroad 1969-1972, president of Amtrak (died 2020)

Deaths

See also 
 List of rail accidents (1920–1929)

References